Semenovod is a rural locality (a khutor) in Mikhaylovka Urban Okrug, Volgograd Oblast, Russia. The population was 72 as of 2010.

Geography 
Semenovod is located 16 km southwest of Mikhaylovka. Otradnoye is the nearest rural locality.

References 

Rural localities in Mikhaylovka urban okrug